Sheepmates was a proposed Australian film from director F. W. Thring based on a 1931 novel by William Hatfield.

Development
Thring bought the rights to Hatfield's novel in mid 1933. He paid a reported £300.

Tom Holt, Efftee's manager, stated that:
The production of 'Sheepmates' is a decided departure from our policy of adhering to comedy. It is a truly remarkable drama of out back Australia, artistically in a class above anything we have yet attempted. Though it may not prove as popular as a Wallace comedy, we are satisfied to produce it merely as an example of our ability to handle this class of subject. No woman appears in the cast, and for this reason it may be described as 'A Journey's End of the Bush'.
The movie was meant to be the first shot at Efftee's new studio at Wattle Path Palais, St Kilda, Melbourne.

Shooting
Filming began in September 1933. After completing some studio scenes, the crew departed to the Queensland and South Australian border for six weeks of shooting around various cattle stations, notably at one owned by Sir Sidney Kidman near Coopers Creek and at Naryilco Station near Tibooburra. The crew initially consisted of Thring, Hatfield and some assistants, plus various camera and sound men; actors did not come until they finished appearing in Thring's stage production of Rope in Melbourne on 7 October.

Shooting was difficult. Thring suffered from exhaustion, several crew members narrowly escaped death in a tent fire, and cattle mustering scenes were delayed due to communication difficulties. Hatfield also claimed that the stage commitments of the actors made finishing the film hard. On the unit's return to Melbourne, studio shooting was postponed to January because the St Kilda facilities were not ready. However all the scenes involving actor Henry Wenham had to be filmed because he was returning to London. Thring decided to abandon production.

Subsequent Fate
In 1936 Thring announced Sheepmates would be one of several novels he was taking with him to Hollywood, with a view to having American writers adapt them into screenplay form, suggesting he still intended to use the footage he had shot. However Thring died soon after he returned to Australia in June and Sheepmates was never completed.

Cast 
Frank Harvey
Campbell Copelin
Claude Flemming
George Wallace
Guy Hastings
Victor Fitzherbert
Henry Wenham

References

External links
Sheepmates at National Film and Sound Archive

Australian drama films
Films directed by F. W. Thring
1930s unfinished films
1930s English-language films